Umberto Tozzi (born 4 March 1952) is an Italian pop and rock singer and composer. Over the course of his career, he has sold over 70 million records in different languages internationally, and his biggest international hits are:
"Stella Stai", "Gloria", "Tu" and "Ti Amo".

Biography
Tozzi was born on 4 March 1952 in Turin, Italy. In 1968, at the age of 16, Umberto Tozzi joined 'Off Sound', one of the many groups that performed in small venues around Turin. In Milan, he met Adriano Pappalardo, with whom he formed a 13-piece band and began a large-scale Italian tour.

In 1974 Tozzi had his first success as a songwriter, with the song "Un Corpo, un'anima" ("One Body, One Soul"), co-written with Damiano Dattoli and performed by Wess and Dori Ghezzi. It appeared on Canzonissima, an Italian music programme running from 1956 to 1974.

In 1976, he released his first album, Donna Amante Mia ("Woman, My Lover"), which contained the single "Io Camminerò" ("I Will Walk"), which was sung with great success by Fausto Leali. In 1977, "Ti Amo", one of Tozzi's most famous songs, was released. It stayed at number one on the Italian song charts for seven months, and went on to become an international success throughout continental Europe. It also achieved decent success in the Americas and Australia, primarily in nightclubs. The single was awarded a gold record award in Australia, despite the fact that it only made number 25 on the charts there in late 1979. In 1978 he released Tu, another hit in Italy, and held an Australian tour, which was organized by the Italo-Australian promoter Duane Zigliotto and concluded at the Sydney Opera House with two full house concerts.

The following year Tozzi recorded one of his most famous songs, "Gloria", which became a major hit in Italy in 1979 and 1980. Jonathan King wrote English lyrics for the song, which became popular in the UK as well in 1979, and was sung and recorded by the English singer Elkie Brooks in 1980. A cover version of the song by the American singer Laura Branigan in 1982 caused the song to grow in popularity in the US as well. Branigan worked with the arranger and keyboardist of Tozzi's own version, Greg Mathieson, to give the song what she called "an American kick." The song reached the top of the charts, reached gold and platinum status in several countries, and stayed on the US pop charts for 36 weeks.

By late 1980 he released "Stella Stai", another one of his major hits. In the early 1980s he released an album called Tozzi, which he recorded at a concert with a band of American musicians, and was his first live recording. Soon after, the Latin Group Menudo recorded the Spanish version of "Stella Stai", entitled "Claridad", which made it one of the highest selling records in the whole of Latin America.

After a period of absence from the music scene, Tozzi returned in 1987 and won the Sanremo Music Festival with the song "Si Può Dare Di Più" ("More can be given"), which he sung with Gianni Morandi and Enrico Ruggeri. In 1987 he also released "Gente Di Mare'"("People of the sea"), which he performed with Raf at Eurovision, and won third place. In 1988, Tozzi released his second live album, The Royal Albert Hall.

In the 1990s, Tozzi recorded several more songs such as "Gli Altri Siamo Noi" ("We Are the Others"), the album Equivocando ("Misunderstanding"), Il Grido ("The Outcry") and Aria e Cielo ("Air and Sky"). He also released a greatest hits compilation, Le Mie Canzoni ("My Songs").

In 2000 and 2005, he performed "Un'altra Vita" ("Another Life") and "Le Parole" ("The Words") at the Sanremo Music Festival. Between the two events, he also released a duet with the French singer Lena Ka of his classic "Ti Amo" as "Ti Amo (Rien Que des Mots)". Tozzi released another greatest hits compilation, a 2-disc set entitled The Best of, and another single, "E Non Volo". In January 2009 he released the single "Cerco ancora te", composed by Emilio Munda and Matteo Gaggioli.

In 2013, his re-edited version of "Gloria", sung in its original Italian, was placed by Martin Scorsese onto the soundtrack of the 2014 Academy Awards nominated blockbuster, The Wolf of Wall Street.

Over the course of his career, Tozzi has sold over 70 million records in different languages internationally.

Discography
Studio albums
1976 - Donna amante mia 
1977 - È nell'aria...ti amo 
1978 - Tu 
1979 - Gloria 
1980 - Tozzi 
1981 - Notte rosa 
1982 - Eva 
1984 - Hurrah! 
1987 - Invisibile 
1991 - Gli altri siamo noi 
1994 - Equivocando 
1996 - Il grido 
1997 - Aria & cielo 
2000 - Un'altra vita 
2005 - Le parole 
2006 - Heterogene
2009 - Non solo live
2012 - Yesterday,today
2015 - Ma che spettacolo 
 Greatest hits albums
1987 - ...minuti di un'eternità 
1991 - Le mie canzoni 
1999 - Bagaglio a mano 
2002 - The best of Umberto Tozzi 
2006 - Tozzi Masini 
2009 - Superstar 
2012 - Yesterday,today 
2018 - The best of Umberto Tozzi
2018 - Raf Tozzi
Live albums
1980 - In Concerto 
1988 - Royal Albert Hall 
2009 - Non solo live 
2017 - Quarant'anni che ti amo 
2017 - Quarant'anni che ti amo in Arena
2019 - Raf Tozzi Due La nostra storia

Notes

External links

Official Umberto Tozzi website
[ Biography of Umberto Tozzi], from Billboard

 

1952 births
Musicians from Turin
Living people
Eurovision Song Contest entrants for Italy
Eurovision Song Contest entrants of 1987
Sanremo Music Festival winners
Italian male singers
Italian pop singers
Spanish-language singers of Italy
People of Apulian descent
People of Campanian descent